Fursultiamine (INN; chemical name thiamine tetrahydrofurfuryl disulfide or TTFD; brand names Adventan, Alinamin-F, Benlipoid, Bevitol Lipophil, Judolor, Lipothiamine) is a medication and vitamin used to treat thiamine deficiency.  Chemically, it is a disulfide derivative of thiamine and is similar in structure to allithiamine.  

It was synthesized in Japan in the 1960s from allithiamine for the purpose of developing forms of thiamine with improved lipophilicity for treating vitamin B1 deficiency (i.e., beriberi), It was subsequently commercialized not only in Japan but also in Spain, Austria, Germany, and the United States.

See also 
 Vitamin B1 analogue

References

Further reading 
 

Formamides
Organic disulfides
Aminopyrimidines
Tetrahydrofurans
Prodrugs
Thiamine